Viktoria Aleksandrovna Nikishina (born 9 September 1984 in Moscow) is a Russian foil fencer. She won a gold medal in the foil team event at the 2008 Summer Olympics.

External links 
Profile  on sports-reference.com

Living people
Russian female foil fencers
Fencers at the 2008 Summer Olympics
Olympic fencers of Russia
Olympic gold medalists for Russia
1984 births
Martial artists from Moscow
Olympic medalists in fencing
Medalists at the 2008 Summer Olympics
21st-century Russian women